Trivia is a compilation album by the rock group Utopia, released in 1986.
It consists of tracks from their albums Utopia, Oblivion and POV, as well as two new tracks, "Fix Your Gaze" and "Monument".

Track listing

Personnel
 Todd Rundgren - vocals, guitar
 Kasim Sulton - vocals, bass guitar
 Roger Powell - vocals, keyboards
 John "Willie" Wilcox - vocals, drums

References

External links

1986 compilation albums
Todd Rundgren albums
Albums produced by Todd Rundgren
Utopia (band) albums
Passport Records albums